Miller Peak may refer to:

 Miller Peak (Arizona), in the Huachuca Mountains, Arizona
 Miller Peak (Explorers Range), in Explorers Range, Antarctica
 Miller Peak (Sentinel Range), in Sentinel Range, Antarctica
 Miller Peak (Montana), mountain in Missoula County, Montana